The Macintosh IIfx is a personal computer designed, manufactured and sold by Apple Computer from March 1990 to April 1992.

The IIfx is the most powerful of the 68030-based Macintosh II family and was replaced at the top of Apple's lineup by the Macintosh Quadra in 1991. It is the last Apple computer released that was designed using the Snow White design language.

Overview
Dubbed "Wicked Fast" by its Product Manager, Frank Casanova – who came to Apple from Apollo Computer in Boston, Massachusetts, where the Boston term "wicked" is commonly used to denote anything extreme – the IIfx runs at a clock rate of 40 megahertz, has 32 KB of Level 2 cache, six NuBus slots, and includes a number of proprietary ASICs and coprocessors. Designed to speed up the machine even further, these chips require system-specific drivers. The 40 MHz speed refers to the main logic board clock (the bus), the Motorola 68030 CPU, and the computer's Motorola 68882 FPU. The machine has eight RAM slots, for a maximum of 128 MB RAM, an enormous amount at the time.

The IIfx features specialized high-speed (80 ns) RAM using 64-pin dual-ported SIMMs, while all other contemporary Macintosh models use 30-pin SIMMs. The extra pins are a separate path to allow latched read and write operations. It is also possible to use parity memory modules; the IIfx is the only stock 68K Macintosh to support them along with special versions of the Macintosh IIci.  The logic board has a total of 8 RAM slots; these must be populated four at a time with 1, 4, or 16 MB chips; this results in a maximum memory amount of 128 MB.

The IIfx includes two special dedicated processors for floppy disk operations, sound, ADB, and serial communications. These I/O chips feature a pair of 10 MHz embedded 6502 CPUs, which is the same CPU family used in Apple II machines.

The IIfx uses SCSI as its hard disk interface, as had all previous Macintosh models since the Macintosh Plus. The IIfx requires a special black-colored SCSI terminator for external drives.

Models 
When first introduced, the IIfx was offered in the following configurations:

 Macintosh IIfx: 4 MB memory, 1.44 MB SuperDrive. US$8,969.
 Macintosh IIfx 4/80: 4 MB memory, 80 MB HDD. US$9,869.
 Macintosh IIfx 4/160: 4 MB memory, 160 MB HDD. US$10,969.
 Macintosh IIfx 4/80 with Parity Support: 4 MB of parity error-checking RAM, 80 MB HDD.

Introduced May 15, 1990:
 Macintosh IIfx 4/80 with A/UX: 4 MB memory, 160 MB HDD, A/UX 2.0 preinstalled. US$10,469. Shipments began in June.

Timeline

References

External links
 Macintosh IIfx profile on Low End Mac
 Apple-History: Macintosh IIfx
 EveryMac: Macintosh IIfx
 Apple Technical Note DV15 (Mirror)

fx
IIfx
IIfx
IIfx
Computer-related introductions in 1990